Events from the year 1921 in Sweden

Incumbents
 Monarch – Gustaf V
 Prime Minister – Gerhard Louis De Geer, Oscar von Sydow, Hjalmar Branting

Events

 30 January – IFK Uppsala defeats Berliner SC, 4–1, in front of 2 022 spectators at the Stockholm Stadium when the first ice hockey game in Sweden is played.
 10–26 September – the 1921 Swedish general election, which was the first Swedish election held under universal suffrage. The first women are elected to the parliament: Nelly Thüring (Social Democrat), Agda Östlund (Social Democrat) Elisabeth Tamm (liberal) and Bertha Wellin (Conservative) in the Lower chamber, and Kerstin Hesselgren in the Upper chamber.

Births

 3 January – Gunnar Eriksson, cross country skier (died 1982).
 22 February – Sune Andersson, footballer (died 2002).
 29 April – Bert Lundin, union leader (died 2018)
 13 July – Git Gay, actress, singer and revue director (died 2007).
 31 July – Tore Sjöstrand, runner (died 2011).
 3 August – Birgitta Arman, actress (died 2007).
 15 September – Nils Rydström, fencer (died 2018)
 6 October – Egon Jönsson, footballer (died 2000).

Deaths
 11 March  – Hulda Lundin, tailor and educator (born 1847) 
 20 November –  Christina Nilsson, Countess de Casa Miranda, operatic soprano (born 1843)
 – Ellen Bergman, musician (born 1842) 
 – Lilly Engström, civil servant (born 1843)  
 - Hilda Sandels, opera singer (born 1830)

References

External links

 
Years of the 20th century in Sweden